Vennavasal is a village located in the Koradacherry block of the Thiruvarur District on the banks of Vennaaru river in the south Indian state of Tamil Nadu.

References 

Villages in Tiruvarur district